The 1969 Giro di Lombardia was the 63rd edition of the Giro di Lombardia cycle race and was held on 11 October 1969. The race started in Milan and finished in Como. The race was won by Jean-Pierre Monseré of the Flandria team.

General classification

Notes

References

1969
Giro di Lombardia
Giro di Lombardia
1969 Super Prestige Pernod